Kayam is a 2011 Malayalam-language film directed by Anil K. Nair starring Bala, Manoj K. Jayan and Shwetha Menon in the lead roles.

Plot 
The fisherman Choonda (Manoj K. Jayan) is the leader of the Kabaddi Team of the village. Thamara (Shwetha Menon) is a native of the neighboring village. She saw her mother's brutal rape and murder. She tires of men of her village vying for her body. She flees with Choonda to his village.

Sasikuttan (Bala), leader of another Kabaddi team, vies with Choonda and both realize they are brothers, long separated. Sasikuttan stays in the village. He has also fallen in love with a local girl Muthu (Aparna).

Cast 
 Bala as Sasikuttan
 Manoj.K.Jayan as Choonda/Divakaran
 Shwetha Menon as Thamara
 Aparna Nair as Muthu
 Seema G Nair as Chinnammu
 Anil Murali
 EA Rajendran

Controversy
Shwetha Menon, who played the lead role in the film has filed a complaint to take legal action against the producer for using the stills from the film for an ad of a sexual steroid pill. Swetha alleges that the scenes shot for the movie has been used to market the product without her knowledge and consent. Shwetha has also filed a complaint to the Vanitha Commission.

References

External links
 Kayam at Oneindia.in

2011 films
2010s Malayalam-language films